The Major Hart River (Ts'íhe Tú in Kaska) is a river in northern British Columbia, Canada, flowing north-east into the Turnagain River, a tributary of the Kechika, south-west of the community of Liard River.

Name origin
The river is named for E.B. Hart, FRGS, who was the first to map this river and conducted the first survey of the area in 1913–14. Major Hart was a member of the Royal North-West Mounted Police who explored the area between Dease Lake and Fort Nelson.

See also
List of British Columbia rivers

References

Liard Country
Rivers of British Columbia
Cassiar Mountains
Cassiar Land District